The Task Force 976 Thai-Iraq (กกล.ฉก ๙๗๖) was a military unit of the Royal Thai Armed Forces, it was a part of the Multi-National Force – Iraq The Mission unit was Humanitarian Operation in Iraq, After the successful US invasion of Iraq, Thailand contributed 423 non-combat troops in August 2003 to nation building and medical assistance in post-Saddam Iraq.

Troops of the Royal Thai Army were attacked in the 2003 Karbala bombings, which killed two soldiers and wounded five others.

However, the Thai mission in Iraq was considered an overall success, and Thailand withdrew its forces in August 2004. The mission was considered the main reason the United States decided to designate Thailand as a major non-NATO ally in 2003.

Force overview
Thailand's Task Force 976 Thai-Iraq Consisted of an engineer battalion, six medical teams, a force security platoon, and a support platoon. The Task Force served under Polish command in MND-CS.

Operations
 The Thai Force deployed to Lima Camp in Karbala in September 2003 to provide engineering support, civil-military operations, and humanitarian assistance. It rebuilt local hospitals and clinics, renovated and reopened schools, and repaired other infrastructure facilities. The Thai engineers also assisted in constructing and repairing MND-CS installations around Karbala, while the medical service teams administered medical care to locals and provided physicians to support the polish medical company.
 On 27 December 2003, Suicide bombers struck Camp Lima, some 100 kilometers southwest of Baghdad, station (all in Karbala). The Camp Lima attacker rammed his vehicle into the post's wall, killing two Thai Security Troops and wounding five other Thai Soldiers. In all, 6 coalition troop were killed (The other 4 being Bulgarian) and 97 coalition troops were wounded. At least 8 civilians were killed and many more wounded. The attack was atypical, as a majority of the violence at the time was centered on the Sunni Triangle are a around Baghdad. Despite The Thai government decided to keep the Task Force deployed until its original mandate expire on 30 September 2004.

See also
Multinational force in Iraq
Post-invasion Iraq, 2003–present
Al Muthanna Task Group
Overwatch Battle Group (West)
Dancon/Irak
Zaytun Division
Japanese Iraq Reconstruction and Support Group

References

Multinational force involved in the Iraq War
Non-combat military operations involving Thailand